Southern Visionary is a microtonal/avant-garde album by MonoNeon released January 6, 2013. The album contains twenty tracks featuring various microtonal musicians on some of the songs.
The compositions on the album displays MonoNeon's unique blend of southern soul and microtonal music.

Track listing

References

External links 
"MonoNeon | "Southern Visionary" Vimeo
"Southern Visionary by MonoNeon" Bandcamp
"Southern Visionary" CD Baby

2013 albums
Experimental music albums